Tallaganda is a national park in New South Wales, Australia.

The national park gives its name to Phallocephale tallagandensis, a species of velvet worm that is known to occur there.

Tallaganda offers many opportunities for rest and recreation. It is an ideal place for bushwalking, camping, mountain biking, orienteering, and 4WD touring. Many animals have found their home here. This is a great place to live for greater gliders, sugar gliders, eastern pygmy possums, as well as for the 55 bird species recorded here.

See also
 Protected areas of New South Wales (Australia)

References

External links
 NSW National Parks and Wildlife Service: Tallaganda National Park

National parks of New South Wales
2001 establishments in Australia